Gun Duel in Durango is a 1957 American Western film directed by Sidney Salkow and starring George Montgomery.

It was originally known as The Last Gun in Durango.

Plot
Will Sabre, an outlaw, decides to reform and ride to a new territory to begin a new life. This angers the gang's leader, Jake Dunsten, who gives chase.

Will encounters a 10-year-old boy burying his father, killed in a covered-wagon attack. Dunsten's men ride up and shoot it out with Will, who uses the man's grave for cover.

Taking the boy, Robbie, with him to the town of Durango, an attempt is made by Will to start fresh. He calls himself Dan Tomlinson and finds a job in a bank. He renews an acquaintance with a former sweetheart, rancher Judy Ollivant, who believes his story that he is no longer an outlaw. Sheriff Howard is suspicious of the stranger, however, and sends a wire seeking information about the notorious Will Sabre, even though a Texas Rangers captain vouches for "Dan."

Dunsten's gang kidnap Robbie and hold him hostage, forcing Will to help them rob the bank. Will goes through with it, but personally captures Dunsten and returns the stolen loot, earning a pardon from the governor that enables him to settle down with Judy and Robbie for good.

Cast
 George Montgomery as Dan
 Ann Robinson as Judy
 Steve Brodie as Dunsten
 Bobby Clark as Robbie
 Frank Ferguson as Sheriff Howard
 Don "Red" Barry as Larry (as Donald Barry)
 Henry Rowland as Roy
 Denver Pyle as Ranger Captain
 Mary Treen as Spinster 
 Al Wyatt Sr. as Jones (as Al Wyatt)
 Boyd "Red" Morgan as Burt (as Red Morgan)
 Joe Yrigoyen as Stacey

See also
 List of American films of 1957

References

External links

1957 films
1950s English-language films
American black-and-white films
American Western (genre) films
1957 Western (genre) films
Films produced by Edward Small
Films scored by Paul Sawtell
Films directed by Sidney Salkow
1950s American films